Benjamin Peirce (1809–1880), Professor of Mathematics at Harvard University.

Benjamin Peirce may also refer to:

 Benjamin Osgood Peirce (1854–1914), Hollis Professor of Mathematics and Natural Philosophy at Harvard University
 USCS Benjamin Peirce, a survey ship in commission in the United States Coast Survey from 1855 to 1868
 Benjamin Peirce (librarian) (1778–1831), librarian of the Harvard Library

See also
Benjamin Pierce (disambiguation)
 Benjamin Pearse (1832–1902), Canadian public servant